Herbert Joseph McGlinchey (November 7, 1904 – June 25, 1992) was an American politician from Pennsylvania who served as a Democratic member of the U.S. House of Representatives for Pennsylvania's 6th congressional district from 1945 to 1947 and the Pennsylvania Senate for the 5th district from 1965 to 1972.

McGlinchey was born in Philadelphia, Pennsylvania.  He worked as a manufacturers’ agent, and supervisor of labor and industry for the eastern district of Pennsylvania, from 1935 to 1937.  He was a delegate to Democratic National Convention in 1936.

He was elected as a Democrat to the 79th Congress.  He was an unsuccessful candidate in 1946, 1948, and 1956.  He was a member of the Pennsylvania Tax Equalization Board from 1957 to 1963.  He was a member of the Pennsylvania State Senate from 1965 to 1972.

He is interred at the Holy Cross Cemetery and Chapel Mausoleum in Mays Landing, New Jersey.

Sources

1904 births
1992 deaths
Democratic Party Pennsylvania state senators
Democratic Party members of the United States House of Representatives from Pennsylvania
20th-century American politicians